Newville is an unincorporated community in Newville Township, DeKalb County, Indiana.

History
Newville was platted in 1837. It took its name from Newville Township. A post office was established at Newville in 1839, and remained in operation until it was discontinued in 1907.

Geography

Notable residents
Jeff Berry, Ku Klux Klan leader

References

Unincorporated communities in DeKalb County, Indiana
Unincorporated communities in Indiana